Erdene is a sum (district) of Govi-Altai Province in western Mongolia. Former sum centre location is 45 08 19N 97 45 02E. In 2009, its population was 2,288.

References 

Populated places in Mongolia
Districts of Govi-Altai Province